Zulema Bregado (born 31 January 1951) is a Cuban gymnast. She competed in six events at the 1968 Summer Olympics.

References

1951 births
Living people
Cuban female artistic gymnasts
Olympic gymnasts of Cuba
Gymnasts at the 1968 Summer Olympics
Sportspeople from Havana
Pan American Games medalists in gymnastics
Pan American Games bronze medalists for Cuba
Gymnasts at the 1967 Pan American Games
Medalists at the 1967 Pan American Games
20th-century Cuban women
20th-century Cuban people
21st-century Cuban women